Berestechko is a town in Lutsk Raion, Volyn Oblast, Ukraine. It is located on the Styr River. Population:

History 
Berestechko received Magdeburg rights in 1547. Around the same era, Socinian communities were active in the town. In 1651 the Battle of Berestechko during the Khmelnytsky Uprising took place near the settlement, in which the Polish–Lithuanian Commonwealth engaged in a battle with Zaporizhian Cossacks and Crimean Tatars. Owing to the loss of the Ukrainian Cossacks, the settlement remained under control of the Polish Royal House. Following the third partition of Poland, Berestechko become part of the Russian Empire.

From 1795 until the Russian Revolution of 1917, Berestechko was part of Volhynian Governorate of the Russian Empire. Following the 1917 October Revolution in Russia, violent outbreaks occurred concerning disputes over the boundaries of each empire. Following an agreement between the two parties, from 1921 to 1939 Berestechko was part of Poland. In September 1939 it became part of the Union of Soviet Socialist Republics following the Soviet invasion of Poland, and became a town in January 1940.

The Germans occupied Berestechko (then part of the Reichskommissariat Ukraine) from 23 June 1941 to April 1944, during which they forced all Jews in the town to live in a ghetto, and eventually executed them in 1942. A witness to the execution in the town stated, "The Jews dug their own pits, accompanied by ten requisitioned Ukrainians. People climbed on trees to watch the execution in spite of the ban. The Germans shot them so that they fell down into the pit." Out of the six synagogues present in the town, only one of them remained standing following the Nazi occupation. During 1943 the town became a refuge for Poles fleeing the Volyn massacre, and the Germans formed a Schutzmannschaft with several Poles to help defend against the Ukrainian Insurgent Army. The town church was attacked by the UPA on 30 December 1943, but the UPA were pushed back. The Poles would eventually leave the town for other nations, or to be deported off to concentration camps. On 17 January 1944, the Germans left the town.

After the end of the war, the town was rebuilt and in 1946 it was electrified. By 1950, a water mill, a sawmill and several schools were in operation, and by 1968 a brick factory, food processing plant, and zootechnical school were also established. As of 1989, the food industry remained the basis of the economy.

Following the dissolution of the Soviet Union the town became part of Ukraine.

Population development

Transport and Infrastructure

Transport 
Berestechko is located 25 km southeast of the railway station Gorokhov, on the Lviv railway. The closest major roads are European route E40, Highway M19, and Highway H17, all approximately situated within 40 km of the town. A local bus operates here, offering connections with local towns and also a connection to Kyiv.

Education 
Berestechko has a secondary school, a vocational school, a hospital, a psycho-neurological boarding school, a library, a house of culture, a cinema and a schoolboy's house. There is a music school on Naberezhna Street. It was previously a synagogue and the building is strictly protected by the state as a historical monument.

Famous residents 

 Volodymyr Leontovych (1881–1968): Construction engineer and architect who helped erect the "Battlefield of Berestechko National Historic Memorial Preserve" monument.
 Ivan Yizhakevych (1864–1962): Realist painter, illustrator, and graphic artist.
 Petro Tabinsky (1888–1950): Religious reformer and dissenter of the Orthodox Church of Russia (in favour of the Ukrainian Church).

References

External links 
 Berestechko at the Encyclopedia of Ukraine
 www.berestechko.info(web-portal)
 

Cities in Volyn Oblast
Volhynian Governorate
Wołyń Voivodeship (1921–1939)
Cities of district significance in Ukraine
Holocaust locations in Ukraine